"I Did It" is a song by American record producer DJ Khaled, featuring American rappers Post Malone, Megan Thee Stallion, Lil Baby, and DaBaby. The song was serviced to UK rhythmic radio on May 21, 2021 and US radio on June 1, 2021, as the fourth single from Khaled's twelfth studio album, Khaled Khaled. It samples "Layla" by Derek and the Dominos.

Background
Prior to the album's release, DJ Khaled declared that the song would become an anthem: "It's one of those records where, like, after a Super Bowl win, or an NBA championship, any accomplishment. The last time I felt like this was '[All I Do is Win]'.

"I Did It" samples Derek and the Dominos' 1971 single "Layla", in particular the guitar riff performed by Duane Allman.

Critical reception
Stereogums Chris De Ville positioned it eleventh in their ranking of songs from Khaled Khaled, stating: "In theory, an all-star posse cut with Post Malone singing over the 'Layla' guitar riff should be a slam dunk. But the hulking, sputtering beat takes all the drama out of Duane Allman's  classic riff, and the verses land like formalities. Worst of all, Posty is basically unrecognizable and unmemorable". Varietys A.D Amorosi shared a similar sentiment: "Even the Derek and the Dominoes' rock-out sample that kicks off the chic, aggressive 'I Did It' with an un-AutoTuned Post Malone singing out strong and full bodied (a rarity on his own records) sounds as if Khaled tailored his tone to suit the vocalist, rather than his usual other-way-around". Clashs Robin Murray said the song "supplies a real golden moment", calling it a "fiery team up". Steve Juon of Rap Reviews criticized the sample for being "overly familiar and easy to pick out immediately", opining that "a little subtlety in selection goes a long way". Luke Fox of Exclaim! called the song "compelling", and said each artist "take turns splashing quick, personality-drenched verses.

Charts

Certifications

Release history

References

2021 singles
2021 songs
DJ Khaled songs
Post Malone songs
Megan Thee Stallion songs
Lil Baby songs
DaBaby songs
Songs written by DJ Khaled
Songs written by Post Malone
Songs written by Megan Thee Stallion
Songs written by Lil Baby
Songs written by DaBaby
Songs written by Tay Keith
Songs written by Eric Clapton
Song recordings produced by Tay Keith
Epic Records singles
Song recordings produced by DJ Khaled